Welcome to the Freakshow may refer to:

 Welcome to the Freak Show, 1997 Christian rock album by DC Talk
 Welcome to the Freakshow (Red Elvises album), 2001 rock album
 Welcome to the Freakshow (Hinder album), 2012 rock album